Strangford is a village in County Down, Northern Ireland.

Strangford may also refer to:

Strangford (Assembly constituency), a constituency in the Northern Ireland Assembly
Strangford (UK Parliament constituency), a constituency in the U.K. House of Commons
Strangford Lough, a large sea lough or inlet
Viscount Strangford, a title in the Peerage of Ireland
Percy Smythe, 6th Viscount Strangford (1780–1855), an Anglo-Irish diplomat sometimes referred to as "Lord Strangford"